This Is My Dream is the fourth album by R&B group Switch.  It was released in 1980.  This is also the only album during their tenure with Motown not to feature input from Jermaine Jackson; they produced this album themselves.

Following a slump with the subpar performance of their third album, Reaching for Tomorrow, released earlier that year, the group rebounded with this effort.  It included the top-ten hit "Love Over And Over Again", which Bobby DeBarge wrote with his sister and future DeBarge member Bunny DeBarge.

Charts

Singles

Track listing
"Believe In Yourself" (Jody Sims)
"Love Over And Over Again" (Bobby DeBarge, Bunny DeBarge)
"Just Imagine" (Gregory Williams, Lee Garrett)
"All I Need Is You" (Bobby DeBarge)
"You And I" (Bobby DeBarge, Gregory Williams)
"What A Feeling" (Gregory Williams)
"Without You In My Life" (Gregory Williams)
"Why'd You Let Love Fall" (Bobby DeBarge, Bunny DeBarge)
"We Can Make It Better" (Eddie Fluellen)
"This Is My Dream" (Bobby DeBarge, Bunny DeBarge)

References

1980 albums
Gordy Records albums
Switch (band) albums